Xinshi is a town under the administration of Jianyang City in northern Sichuan, People's Republic of China, located about  southeast of downtown Jianyang on the southern (right) bank of the Tuo River and is served by China National Highway 321. , it has one residential community and 34 villages under its administration.

References

Township-level divisions of Sichuan